Interest is payment from a borrower to a lender of an amount above repayment of the amount borrowed, at a particular rate.

Interest may also refer to:

 Interest (emotion), a feeling that causes attention to focus on an object, event, or process. 
 Government interest, a concept in law that allows the government to regulate a given matter
 National interest, a country's goals and ambitions

See also
 
 Legal interest (disambiguation)
 Conflict of interest, where serving one interest could involve working against another
 Point of interest, a specific point location that someone may find useful or interesting
 Self-interest, a focus on the needs or desires (interests) of one's self
 Sexual attraction, attraction on the basis of sexual desire 
 Vested interest (communication theory)